Haematomma nicoyense is a species of corticolous (bark-dwelling) lichen in the family Haematommataceae. Found in Costa Rica, it was formally described as a new species in 2006 by Matthew Nelsen, Robert Lücking, and José Luis Chaves. Here, in lowland to lower montane moist forests, the species was found growing on the lower trunks of exposed trees and on fence posts. The specific epithet refers to the type locality.

Soralia are granular, and scattered across the thallus surface, measuring up to 1 mm in diameter. Ascospores number eight per ascus, and are narrowly  (spindle-shaped) with between 3 and 6 septa and have dimensions of 40–65 by 3–4 μm. Lichen products found in Haematomma nicoyense include russulone, atranorin, and sphaerophorin.

References

nicoyense
Lichen species
Lichens described in 2006
Lichens of Central America
Taxa named by Robert Lücking